Faisal Devji is a historian who specializes in studies of Islam, globalization, violence and ethics.

Early life and education
Devji was born in Dar es Salaam in 1964 to a family of western Indian origin. His undergraduate education was at the University of British Columbia, where he received double honors in history and anthropology. He received his PhD from the University of Chicago with his dissertation Muslim Nationalism: Founding Identity in Colonial India and was chosen to be a Junior Fellow at the Harvard Society of Fellows.

Devji is Zanzibari, and is now a Canadian citizen.

Career
Devji's multidisciplinary work grounds empirical historical issues in philosophical questions. He has taught at The New School in New York City. He has taught at Yale University.

In 2005, Cornell University Press published his Landscapes of the Jihad: Militancy, Morality, Modernity, exploring the ethical content of jihad as opposed to its more widely studied purported political content. The book draws a distinction between the majority of Islamic fundamentalist organizations concerned with the establishing of states and al-Qaeda with its decentralized structure and emphasis on moral rather than political action. His next book was The Terrorist in Search of Humanity: Militant Islam and Global Politics, published by Columbia University Press in October 2008.

Since 2009, Devji is University Reader in Modern South Asian History, Oxford University. He also is a senior fellow at the Institute for Public Knowledge (New York University) and Yves Oltramar Chair at the Graduate Institute of International and Development Studies in Geneva.

He published The Impossible Indian: Gandhi and the Temptations of Violence, by Hurst & Co. in March 2011.

References

External links
Faisal Devji's homepage at the New School
Online essays by Faisal Devji at openDemocracy.net

1964 births
Living people
Zanzibari people of Indian descent
21st-century Canadian historians
Canadian male non-fiction writers
University of British Columbia alumni
The New School faculty
Academic staff of the Graduate Institute of International and Development Studies
Tanzanian emigrants to Canada
Canadian people of Gujarati descent
People from Dar es Salaam